John Wise (26 February 1901 – 12 May 1971) was an Australian sports shooter. He competed in the 300 m rifle event at the 1948 Summer Olympics.

References

1901 births
1971 deaths
Australian male sport shooters
Olympic shooters of Australia
Shooters at the 1948 Summer Olympics
Place of birth missing